Nigeria participated at the 2018 Summer Youth Olympics in Buenos Aires, Argentina from 6 October to 18 October 2018.

Athletics

Boys
Track and road events

Field events

Girls
Track and road events

Field events

Badminton

Nigeria was given a quota to compete by the tripartite committee. 

 Girls' singles – 1 quota
Singles

Team

Boxing

Girls

Canoeing

Nigeria qualified two boats based on its performance at the 2018 World Qualification Event.

 Girls' C1 - 1 boat
 Girls' K1 - 1 boat

Girls

Golf

Nigeria received a quota of two athletes to compete by the tripartite committee.
Individual

Team

Table tennis

Nigeria qualified one table tennis player based on its performance at the African Continental Qualifier.

 Girls' singles - Esther Oribamise

Weightlifting

Wrestling

Based on its performance at the 2018 African Cadet Championships Nigeria has two female wrestlers in a qualifying position.

Key:
  – Victory by Fall
  – Without any points scored by the opponent
  – With point(s) scored by the opponent
  – Without any points scored by the opponent
  – With point(s) scored by the opponent

References

2018 in Nigerian sport
Nations at the 2018 Summer Youth Olympics
Nigeria at the Youth Olympics